International Capital Markets is an Australian forex and CFD broker launched in 2007. It is currently headquartered in Sydney, Australia. It currently sponsors several football clubs such as Bayer Leverkusen and other teams from Bundesliga and La Liga leagues.

History
Andrew Budzinksi formed International Capital Markets (also known as IC Markets) in 2007.

After the Swiss Central Bank dropped the Swiss franc's peg against the euro in 2015, the company announced it would cover 90% of client negative balances after receiving complaints from clients about losses caused by fluctuations in pricing.

IC Markets appointed Denys Denisov as the company's general manager in 2017. He was replaced by former Rakuten Securities Australia chief operating officer Nick Twidale in 2019.

IC Markets launched operations in Cyprus in 2019 after securing a CySEC regulation in 2018.

IC Markets announced it was sponsoring German Bundesliga football clubs Bayer Leverkusen, Hertha BSC, FC Augsburg, Arminia Bielefeld, SpVgg Greuther Fürth, and VfL Bochum in 2021. It also announced sponsorships for La Liga football clubs Real Sociedad, Athletic Club Bilbao, Getafe CF, Granada CF, RCD Mallorca, and Cádiz CF.

IC Markets had initially also signed on as a sponsor for Inter Milan after the club's deal with Pirelli expired, but the club canceled the contract shortly after it was signed. Inter Milan accused IC Markets of failing to comply with contractual payment obligations, while IC Markets denied the accusations. Since IC Markets had made an initial deposit on the agreement, the company sued Inter Milan for reimbursement of the initial payment of €2.5 million.

IC Markets also joined the self-regulatory organization Financial Commission in 2021.

In 2022, the UK's Financial Conduct Authority warned against a clone firm investment scam involving an unauthorized organization known as ICMarketsPro impersonating IC Markets.

Services
IC Markets operates in regions such as Latin America, Africa, Europe, and its native Australia. The organization runs its European operations with its regulated entity in Cyprus.

IC Markets announced support for PayPal fund transfers in 2017.

In 2021, IC Markets announced support for digital currency CFDs on Binance Coin, Cardano, Dogecoin, Tezos, and Uniswap.

IC Markets also offers the Metatrader 4 and 5 and cTrader electronic trading platforms.

References

Financial services companies based in Sydney
Financial services companies established in 2007